文山 may refer to:

In the Mandarin Chinese reading Wénshān:
Wenshan District, Taipei, Taiwan, Republic of China
Wenshan Line of the Taipei Rapid Transit System, Taiwan, Republic of China
Wenshan Zhuang and Miao Autonomous Prefecture, Yunnan, People's Republic of China
Wenshan City, seat of the autonomous prefecture
Wenshan Airport, which serves the autonomous prefecture
Wenshan Lake at Shenzhen University, Guangdong, People's Republic of China
Vincent Fang (方文山), lyricist

In the Korean reading Munsan:
Munsan-myeon, Seocheon-gun, Chungcheongnam-do, South Korea

In various Japanese readings;
Bunsan-gun (文山郡), Taihoku Prefecture, Japanese Empire
Inbe no Fumiyama (斎部文山, 822-867), Heian era noble